The 1975–76 Utah Stars season was the 6th and final season of the Utah Stars in the American Basketball Association. They folded due to financial pressures sixteen games into the regular season. As a result, the Stars were not part of the ABA–NBA merger that occurred at the conclusion of the season.  Professional basketball would return to the Salt Lake City area when the New Orleans Jazz of the National Basketball Association relocated there following the 1978–79 season.

Offseason

Draft picks

Preseason transactions

 May 1975: Stars sign Steve Green

Preseason exhibition games

Like most ABA teams, the Stars played several preseason exhibition games against NBA opponents.  Their first for the 1975 preseason came on October 1, 1975, against the Philadelphia 76ers.  The two teams met in the 76ers' home arena and the 76ers prevailed, 116-111.

On October 7 the Stars hosted the Seattle SuperSonics.  The two teams combined for 119 shots from the free-throw line.  Ron Boone scored 23 points and led all scorers.  Seattle's Leonard Gray was ejected for punching Utah's Steve Green.  The Stars won, 122-119.

On October 11, 1975, the Kansas City–Omaha Kings met the Stars in the Denver Nuggets' home arena in Colorado.  The game was part of a double-header, with the Nuggets facing the NBA's Golden State Warriors in the other half.  17,018 fans attended, which at the time was a record crowd for a basketball game in Colorado.  Ron Boone led the Stars with 40 points (18 of them in the first quarter) and the Stars defeated the Kings 114-111.

On October 14 the Chicago Bulls came to Salt Lake City to face the Stars.  The game went into overtime and the Bulls pulled it out, 122-119.  In a sign of what was to come for the Stars later in the season, the Bulls later filed a lawsuit against the Stars, claiming that Utah failed to pay the Bulls a guaranteed $17,000 for playing the game at the Salt Palace.

The next day, on October 15, the Stars went on the road to face the Seattle SuperSonics again, this time in Seattle.  John Roche scored 33 points for the Stars as Utah won 108-98.

On October 21, 1975, the Milwaukee Bucks came to the Salt Palace to face the Stars.  Unbeknownst to anyone at the time, this would be the final exhibition game ever played between ABA and NBA teams, as the two leagues merged at the end of the season.  The final ABA vs. NBA contest ended with the Stars victorious, 106-101.

Regular season

Roster

24 Ron Boone
32 Randy Denton
25 Jim Eakins
34 Steve Green
22 Moses Malone
15 John Roche
20 Al Smith
42 Charlie Edge
44 Goo Kennedy
10 Rick Mount
5 Travis Grant
14 Ken Gardner

Season standings

Month by Month

October 1975

On October 25 the Stars opened their season at home against the San Diego Sails.  5,525 fans saw the Sails win 99-97 behind Bo Lamar's 29 points.  On October 29 the Stars went on the road to play the Denver Nuggets.  9,201 fans saw the two teams set an ABA record for the most personal fouls in a game (83).  Denver's David Thompson led all scorers with 28 points as the Nuggets won 122–117.  October 31 saw the Stars' first victory of the season, a 123–116 home win against the Virginia Squires behind Ron Boone's 37 points.  4,560 attended, and the Stars' home attendance was clearly behind what it had been in prior years.

November 1974

On November 1 the Stars traveled to Louisville to face the Kentucky Colonels.  7,983 saw Bird Averitt lead all scorers with 23 as Kentucky won 118–105.  The next night saw the Stars on the road again and they lost to the New York Nets 123–111 with the game's high scorer being Julius Erving with 35.  On November 4 the Stars hosted the Spirits of St. Louis; 3,965 watched the Stars lose 115–110.  The next evening the Stars lost on the road to the San Antonio Spurs 121-117 despite Ron Boone's game-high 29 points.  The next night (November 6) at home the Stars lost to the Denver Nuggets 111–105; 4,717 attended and Randy Denton led all scorers with 29.

November 12 saw the Stars win at home against the New York Nets, 134-114; Ron Boone led all scorers with 35 before 7,125 fans.  November 14 saw the Stars at home again, this time before 6,995 fans, but Billy Knight scored 43 points (31 in the second half) to lead the Indiana Pacers to a 127–119 win.  November 19 saw the Stars host the Pacers at home again and this time Billy Keller led all scorers with 33 as the Pacers won 130–110 in front of 9,073 fans.

November 21 saw the Stars on the road, losing to the lowly Virginia Squires 106-98 in front of 7,292 fans in Norfolk as Ticky Burden tallied a game-high 34 points.  On November 23 the Stars lost on the road to the New York Nets 113-106 as Julius Erving scored 33 points before 6,664 fans.

On November 25 the Stars took the homestanding ABA Champion Kentucky Colonels to two overtimes before succumbing 125–123 before 8,477 fans.  Artis Gilmore scored 45 points for Kentucky and Utah's Ron Boone had 42.  Two nights later on November 27 the Stars hosted the defending champion Colonels in Salt Lake City in front of 8,233 fans and the two teams went to overtime again.  Bird Averitt had 43 points for Kentucky including a 3-point field goal with one second left in regulation to send the game to overtime, but the Stars won 128–126.

On November 29 the Stars hosted the Spirits of St. Louis before 4,683 fans.  The game was played amid reports that the two franchises were in negotiations to merge.  Ron Boone and Maurice Lucas each scored 28 points.  The Stars won 136-100.  Though it was not known that night, the contest would prove to be the Utah Stars' final game.

December 1975

The Utah franchise, beset with financial problems, had gained and lost new owners who were unable to make their payments and the team reverted to owner Bill Daniels as a result.  Daniels was in poor financial shape himself by this point and had entered into negotiations with the Spirits of St. Louis about a possible merger.  The merger talks were unsuccessful and on December 1, 1975, as a result of the Stars being unable to meet their payroll, the ABA announced that the Utah Stars franchise was folding.

Upon the Stars' dissolution the ABA allowed the franchise to sell four players (Moses Malone, Ron Boone, Randy Denton and Steve Green) and one player (Jim Eakins) to the Virginia Squires.

The Utah Stars were no more.  The ABA merged with the NBA at the conclusion of the season but Salt Lake City would go without professional basketball until the NBA's New Orleans Jazz relocated there in 1979.

Records
 Most personal fouls by two teams in one game (83): Utah Stars at Denver Nuggets, October 29, 1975

Transactions

Draft and preseason signings
May 20, 1975: Stars are purchased from Bill Daniels by Snellen M. Johnson and Lyle E. Johnson
May 1975: Stars sign Steve Green
October 1975: Moses Malone misses the start of season due to a broken foot

Trades and transactions
November 1975: franchise reverts to Bill Daniels as new owners fail to make required payments
November 29, 1975: Spirits of St. Louis and Utah Stars unsuccessfully negotiated for a merger of the two franchises
December 1, 1975: Utah Stars folded by ABA after failing to meet payroll.  Moses Malone, Ron Boone, Randy Denton and Steve Green are sold to the Spirits of St. Louis; Jim Eakins is sold to the Virginia Squires

References

1975-76 Utah Stars season on BasketballReference.com

External links 
RememberTheABA.com 1975-–76 regular season and playoff results
RememberTheABA.com Utah Stars page
RememberTheABA.com 1975–76 game by game results

Utah
Utah Stars seasons
Utah Stars, 1975–76
Utah Stars, 1975–76